Daniel B. Zimmerman Mansion, also known as Manor Hill, now The Georgian Inn of Somerset, is a historic mansion located at Somerset Township, Somerset County, Pennsylvania.  It was designed by noted Philadelphia architect Horace Trumbauer and built in 1915.  It is a 3-story, brick Georgian Revival style mansion, with a five bay central section with a hipped roof, flanked by asymmetrical wings.  It has housed a hotel since 2010.

It was added to the National Register of Historic Places in 1995.

References

External links
The Georgian Inn of Somerset website

Houses in Somerset County, Pennsylvania
Hotels in Pennsylvania
Houses completed in 1915
Houses on the National Register of Historic Places in Pennsylvania
National Register of Historic Places in Somerset County, Pennsylvania
1915 establishments in Pennsylvania
Georgian Revival architecture in Pennsylvania
Horace Trumbauer buildings